Earth-Science Reviews is a monthly peer-reviewed scientific journal published by Elsevier. It covers all aspects of Earth sciences. The editors-in-chief for this journal are A. Chin, C. Doglioni, J.L. Florsheim, M.F.J. Flower, G.R. Foulger, A. Gómez-Tuena, S. Khan, S. Marriott, A.D. Miall, G.F. Panza, J.A. Sanchez-Cabeza, M. Strecker, E.S. Takle, M. Widdowson, and P.B. Wignall.

Abstracting and indexing
This journal is abstracted and indexed by:

According to the Journal Citation Reports, the journal has a 2012 impact factor of 7.339.

References

External links 

Earth and atmospheric sciences journals
Elsevier academic journals
English-language journals
Monthly journals
Publications established in 1966